William Michael Edward Mellen (April 6, 1848 – May 14, 1906) was an American physician and politician who served as the fourth Mayor of Chicopee, Massachusetts.

Early life
Mellen was born in Worcester, Massachusetts.

Education
Mellen received his medical diploma from the University of Michigan Medical School in 1876.

Medical career
After he graduated from medical school Mellen practiced medicine in Northampton, Massachusetts for a year, then in Chicopee, Massachusetts from 1878 until his death in May 1906.  
In 1880 Mellen was admitted as a Fellow of the Massachusetts Medical Society. In 1890 Mellen was chosen a delegate to the Tenth International Medical Congress in Berlin.

Family life
In 1883 Mellen married Kate M. Burke of Chicopee, they had one child, a daughter.

Death
Mellen died in Chicopee, Massachusetts of a cerebral hemorrhage, on May 14, 1906.

Bibliography
A Digest of the Acts of the Commonwealth Relating to the Massachusetts Medical Society: Together with the By-laws & Rules & Orders of the Society & Councillors, Boston, Massachusetts: Massachusetts Medical Society, page 24, (1881).
Massachusetts of Today: A Memorial of the State, Historical and Biographical, Issued for the World's Columbian Exposition at Chicago, page 427, (1892).
Medical Record: A weekly Journal of Medicine and Surgery, Vol. 69, No. 21., Obituary Notes, New York, New York: WM. WOOD & Co., page 842,  (May 26, 1906).
Michigan Alumnus, Vol XII, No 115 News-Obituaries, Ann Arbor, Michigan: The Alumni Association of the University of Michigan, p. 443, (June 1906).

Footnotes

  

1848 births
Physicians from Massachusetts
Massachusetts Democrats
Massachusetts city council members
Mayors of Chicopee, Massachusetts
1906 deaths
University of Michigan Medical School alumni
19th-century American politicians